"Do We Rock?" is a song by British group Point Break. It was released on 27 September 1999 on CD single in the United Kingdom through Eternal Records / WEA Records as the band's debut single. It was included on their debut studio album, Apocadelic.

Track listing
 CD1 (WEA216CD1)
 "Do We Rock?"  (radio mix)  - 3:17
 "Do We Rock?"  (Jay Jay's Hip Hop mix)  - 4:07
 "Do We Rock?"  (New Mount City Breakers mix)  - 5:26
 CD_Rom Video - "Do We Rock?"

 CD2 (WEA216CD2)
 "Do We Rock?"  (radio mix)  - 3:17	
 "Do We Rock?"  (New Decade mix)  	
 CD_ROM Video - Exclusive Point Break Interview

Weekly charts

Release history

References

1999 debut singles
1999 songs
Point Break (band) songs
Songs written by Graham Stack (record producer)